The GESIS – Leibniz Institute for the Social Sciences is the largest German infrastructure institute for the social sciences. It is headquartered in Mannheim, with a location in Cologne. With basic research-based services and consulting covering all levels of the scientific process, GESIS supports researchers in the social sciences. As of 2017, the president of GESIS is Christof Wolf.

GESIS is part of the Leibniz Association and receives federal and state funding.

History 
Established in 1986 as German Social Science Infrastructure Services, GESIS originally consisted of the three independent institutes: 
 Social Science Information Centre (IZ) in Bonn, 
 Central Archive for Empirical Social Research (ZA) in Cologne, and 
 Centre for Survey Research and Methodology (ZUMA) in Mannheim.

In 2007, the three GESIS institutes merged into one. In November 2008, GESIS added "Leibniz Institute for the Social Sciences" to its name in order to emphasize its membership in the Leibniz Association.

In November 2011, GESIS Bonn and Cologne were merged into one location in Cologne.

Services 
The GESIS social science services available to support the work of researchers are aligned to the five phases of the research data cycle.

Planning Studies & Collecting Data 
 Survey Methods Consulting: How to Plan a Study – Consulting services to researchers throughout the course of a research project.
 Basic Knowledge – In the sense of Open Science get extensive information on all aspects of current social science research.
 Cognitive Pretesting – Optimising questions and survey instruments.
 Items & Scales – Researching and developing new items and scales for research projects.
 Sampling – Drawing of (telephone) samples and complex samples for research projects.

Finding and accessing data 
 ALLBUS (German General Social Survey / ) – GESIS collects up-to-date data on attitudes, behavior, and social structure from the German population.
 GLES (German Longitudinal Election Study) – Data from Germany's largest and most ambitious national election study for examining and analyzing the electorate is available free of charge.
 PIAAC (Programme for the International Assessment of Adult Competencies) – GESIS is an integrated partner in the OECD study examining adult competency levels simultaneously across 24 countries via its population survey of adult skills.
 ISSP (International Social Survey Programme) – The international collaboration conducts annual conjoint surveys on social science relevant topics across 48 countries.
 EVS (European Values Study) – The empirical longitudinal survey conducted in 47 countries is aimed at providing insight into changes in human values.
 CSES (Comparative Study of Electoral Systems) – The international election study integrates data from post-election surveys from approximately 40 countries.
 GESIS Panel - The GESIS Panel offers the academic social science community a possibility to collect primary data within a probability-based omnibus access panel free of charge. The data are representative of the German speaking population aged between 18 and 70 years (at the time of recruitment) and permanently residing in Germany. Data collected within the GESIS Panel can be used by academic researchers free of charge, e.g. to conduct secondary research.

Processing & Analyzing Data 
 Survey Methods Consulting for Data Analysis – Consulting services for research projects.
 Weighting and Analysis of Complex Samples – Services for calculating design and fitting weights and handling missing values.
 Data Harmonization at all Levels - Advice, tools and thematic harmonized data from different sources.
 Metadata & Tools for Analyzing Official Data - Tools for the preparation and analysis of official microdata.
 Analyses in the Safe Rooms - Analyzing sensitive and restricted-access data on site. 
 Tools for Analyzing Digital Behavioral Data - Comprehensive services and information on the collection and analysis of digital behavioral data.

Archiving and sharing 
 Archive and share data - Archiving social science data in the GESIS data archive
 Share scripts and syntax - Share scripts and syntax via SowiDataNet|datorium.
 Share measurement instruments - Share tested measurement instruments via ZIS (Open Access Repository for Measurement Instruments).
 Archive and share open access publications - Find and publish publications via Social Science Open Access Repository (SSOAR).
 Register data - Institutions can get DOIs for their data.

Training 
GESIS offers a wide range of events, especially training courses in social research methods, that develop participants’ applied research methods skills in depth and in breadth covering the whole survey life cycle. 
Since 2012 the GESIS Summer School in Survey Methodology is offered for PhD students and young researchers. The GESIS Spring Seminar on advanced methods of quantitative data analysis and the GESIS Methodenseminar on basic knowledge and skills in quantitative data analysis are taking place for over 40 and 30 years, respectively. The trainings are completed by GESIS Workshops on current research methods and survey programs.

Research 
GESIS conducts research on content and methodology focusing on survey methodology, social structure, attitudes and behaviors in modern societies, applied computer science and information science.

GESIS Research Data Centers 
The GESIS Research Data Centers carry out knowledge transfer in continuing education offers and publications based on own content research and offer data services and consulting for users.
 RDC ALLBUS
 RDC Elections
 RDC German Microdata Lab
 RDC International Survey Programmes

GESIS Journals 
GESIS publishes multiple academic journals in the area of the social sciences.

 Historical Social Research (HSR) 
 An international, bilingual scientific journal featuring articles on new historical research methods and can be found in the Social Sciences Citation Index.
 Social Indicators Information Service (ISI) 
 Published twice yearly to inform both academic experts and the interested public about selected trends in general social change.
 methods, data, analyses (mda)
 Articles and reports on all questions important to survey methodology with an emphasis on new methodological and/or statistical knowledge and current applications of methods in research practice.
 Survey Methods: Insights from the Field
 A peer-reviewed online journal to promote professional exchange on practical survey research issues and discussion on new and promising paths in survey research.

Executive board and statutory bodies 
GESIS Leibniz Institute for the Social Sciences is a registered organization with the following statutory bodies:

 General Meeting of Members
 Board of Trustees
 President
 Scientific Advisory Board
 User Advisory Board

Since June 2015, Prof. Dr. Christof Wolf is acting as the interim president of GESIS.

Organization 
GESIS is divided into six scientific departments; their research-based services and products cover the entire spectrum of empirical social research.

 Computational Social Science (CSS)
 Data and Research on Society (DRS)
 Data Services for the Social Sciences (DSS)
 Survey Data Curation (SDC)
 Survey Design and Methodology (SDM)
 Knowledge Technologies for the Social Sciences (WTS)

The research data centers are positioned across all the departments. In addition to access to unique data, they also provide special preparation of existing datasets, additional materials and context information as well as offering consulting based on own research.

WikiWho
WikiWho, developed by Fabian Flöck and Maribel Acosta and hosted by GESIS, "parses the complete set of all historical revisions (versions) (of Wikipedia articles in different languages) in order to find out who wrote and/or removed and/or reinserted which exact text at token level at what revision". WhoColor and whoVIS are in development. Researchers developing and using WikiWho, also investigated the Gamergate (harassment campaign). In 2021, Fabian Flöck planned to leave GESIS and shut down WikiWho sometime in 2022, however, a Wikimedia Foundation software engineer is working to migrate the infrastructure. Wikimedia Foundation, Community Tech Team has released Who Wrote That?, a browser extension, for Mozilla Firefox and Chromium-based browsers. using WikiWho. Contropedia is a related "platform for the real-time analysis and visualization of such controversies in Wikipedia".

References

External links 
 GESIS
 SSOAR – Social Science Open Access Repository
 DBK – GESIS data catalogue
 ZACAT – GESIS online data portal
 HISTAT – Database Historical Time Series
 methods - data - analyses (mda)
 Social Indicators Information Service (ISI)

Social science institutes
Leibniz Association
1986 establishments in West Germany
Research institutes established in 1986